Clepsis pinaria is a species of moth of the family Tortricidae. It is found in Cuba.

The wingspan is 10–13.5 mm. The ground colour of the forewings is cream preserved in the terminal area and at the edges of the markings. The rest of the wing is suffused and strigulated (finely streaked) with leaden grey. The markings are rust brown. The hindwings are pale brownish grey.

Etymology
The species name refers to the Pinar River, where the species was collected.

References

Moths described in 2010
Clepsis